Wild Wing Restaurants is a Canadian franchised restaurant chain that specializes in chicken wings, quick serve foods, and other related products.

History
Wild Wing Restaurants Inc., originally known as Wild Wing, was established in Sunderland, Ontario on March 17, 1999 by Rick Smiciklas. Its main business is focused on flavoured chicken wings. By 2008, it had opened 32 franchise restaurants in Ontario, and by March 2016 it had 85 locations throughout Canada, primarily in Ontario. The business was acquired by Clark McKeown on March 5, 2015.

Operations
Wild Wing Restaurants headquarters is located in King City, a combined corporate office and restaurant that had a soft opening in early March 2016. It had previously had a temporary headquarters in Aurora. and has 85 locations, primarily in Ontario.

See also
List of Canadian restaurant chains
 List of fast-food chicken restaurants

References

Companies based in King, Ontario
Fast-food franchises
Fast-food poultry restaurants
Restaurants in Ontario
Restaurant chains in Canada